Edward Fleetwood John Pellew, 4th Viscount Exmouth DL JP (24 June 1861 – 31 October 1899), was a British peer who inherited the title of Viscount Exmouth from his uncle and held the title for 23 years.  He was the great-grandson of Edward Pellew, 1st Viscount Exmouth.

Life
Edward Pellew was born on 24 June 1861 in the county of Devon, England.  His parents were the Hon. Fleetwood John Pellew (the fourth son of Pownoll Pellew, 2nd Viscount Exmouth) and Emily Sarah Ferguson.  On 3 June 1884, in Arborfield Parish, Berkshire, he married Edith Hargreaves, the daughter of Captain Thomas Hargreaves of the 3rd Royal Lancashire Militia. Their children were Georgina Cecily Pellew (18 December 1885 – 17 May 1930), who died unmarried; and Edward Addington Hargreaves Pellew, 5th Viscount Exmouth (12 November 1890 – 16 August 1922).

Pellew's service in the British Army's auxiliary forces was varied: he began his career as a lieutenant in the 1st Devon Militia (later the 4th Battalion, Devonshire Regiment). He then transferred to the Royal 1st Devon Yeomanry on 7 March 1883, but resigned his commission on 9 August 1884. Later he was re-commissioned into the 5th (The Hay Tor) Volunteer Battalion, Devonshire Regiment, promoted to lieutenant on 17 February 1897, and to captain on 9 June 1898. He was also a Deputy Lieutenant, Justice of the Peace for Devon, and a Doctor of Law.

The Viscount and Viscountess spent their honeymoon in the United States, arriving in New York City on 23 June 1884 on board the SS Gallia.  At the time the Viscount's cousin, Henry Pellew, later the 6th Viscount Exmouth, and his wife resided there. The Viscountess was a cousin of the Drayton family of New York and the Coleman family of Pennsylvania.  In July 1884 they visited Long Branch, New Jersey as well as Newport, Rhode Island.  August saw them back in Long Branch for an extended tour by Mr. George W. Childs, the publisher of the Evening Public Ledger.  They returned to England on 1 October 1884 on board the SS Servia.

When the 1st Viscount Exmouth was granted his title he also was awarded an perpetual annual pension of £2,000.  These pensions were not seen favourably by the public and in late 1893 Parliament converted the pension to a lump sum payment of £53,890.  This pension was well invested, and by the time of the death of the Edward Pellew, 5th Viscount Exmouth the sum had grown to £325,000.

Edward Pellew died in London on 31 October 1899.  He was succeeded in his titles by his eight-year-old son Edward Pellew.

Arms

References

1861 births
1899 deaths
Edward 04
Devonshire Regiment officers
Royal 1st Devon Yeomanry officers
Deputy Lieutenants of Devon